Diane Dixon is an American politician serving in the California State Assembly. A Republican, she represents the 72nd State Assembly District, which includes Huntington Beach, Newport Beach, Seal Beach, Laguna Hills, Laguna Woods, Lake Forest, Aliso Viejo, and Laguna Beach. She was a former mayor and city councilwoman of Newport Beach, California.

In 2020, Dixon ran for the California State Assembly against first-term Democrat Cottie Petrie-Norris.  Dixon lost the general election by a very narrow margin.

In 2022, redistricting made the district more Republican and Petrie-Norris ran in a neighboring district.  Dixon won the election by a comfortable margin.

References

External links 
Official Website
Dianne Dixon on Ballotpedia
Campaign Website

Republican Party members of the California State Assembly
Women state legislators in California
Year of birth missing (living people)
Living people
21st-century American women politicians
People from Newport Beach, California
Women mayors of places in California
Women city councillors in California